The 1988–89 season was the 65th season in the existence of AEK Athens F.C. and the 30th consecutive season in the top flight of Greek football. They competed in the Alpha Ethniki, the Greek Cup and the UEFA Cup. The season began on 21 August 1988 and finished on 21 May 1989.

Overview

One of the most important seasons in the history of AEK, with the team finally managing to win the championship after 10 rough years. In the summer of 1988, an important administrative change came to the team, since the major shareholder, Andreas Zafiropoulos could continue with the overwhelming majority of the fans against him and handed over the management of club to the nightclub owner, Stratos Gidopoulos. Dušan Bajević, now a manager, returned after years at AEK, where he was loved in the past as a footballer. Bajević, supported by the management and the people of the club, very quickly built a tight and well-worked team, which had the best defense in the league and knew how to get the necessary points in most matches. Gidopoulos, for his part, in addition to the very successfull transfers he achieved, brought for the first time after years a wind of optimism, as he knew how to cheer up the team and the crowd with his statements and in general he proved to be a very capable agent who had the means to the players and the people of AEK not to feel at a disadvantage against their much stronger financial rivals. That finally turned out to be a dream season, although few expected that to happen, since the team had to face much stronger financial rivals in the league. The big transfer of the Polish star, Mirosław Okoński took place, Stelios Manolas was convinced to stay, but still AEK seemed to be an outsider for winning the league.

The team played in the UEFA Cup, where they played against Athletic Bilbao in the first round. In the first leg in a full AEK Stadium, despite the pouring rain, AEK pressed from the start and managed to take an early lead with a very impressive header from Pittas. The game was very intense and particularly hard. The Basques pushed for an equaliser, but AEK also had chances to extend the score. In the end the fluid 1–0 remained until the end and their appointment was renewed for 14 days later in the Basque Country. In the second leg, AEK stunned a packed San Mamès and concieded 2 quick goals by Uralde. By the 6th minute, Athletic had already a qualification score and the remaining 84 minutes went by with AEK looking for the goal. In the end, the "golden" goal never came, despite some tepid chances. A highlight of the match at San Mamès, the human wall erected by the Basque fans to protect the AEK fans from the Spanish police, an unforgettable move that was duly appreciated by the Greek excursionists.

Clearly the most important moment of the year was the 0–1 away victory against Olympiacos on 7 May 1989 at the Olympic Stadium, for the penultimate matchday, which actually gave AEK the championship. A match before which too many considered the red and whites to be a sure winner and did not give AEK any chance, even though the draw was also in their favor. The atmosphere at the period of the preparation of the two teams before this match was heated, as the players of Olympiacos cut a celebratory cake with the inscription "Olympiacos-AEK 4–0" at the "tower" of their president Argyris Saliarelis in Aegina, while at the same time the AEK were working hard, doing a mini-preparation at Parnitha.

The match started with Olympiacos pressing hard, but AEK defense and Ikonomopoulos held very well at the back. The pressure of the red and whites kept increasing but AEK did not concede a goal. The save by Manolas on the goaline with an amazing header after a header by Détári, and in general the spirited play of the whole team kept them in tact during the match. At the 83rd minute, in a counterattack Karagiozopoulos, who had came in as a substitute, after an unrepeatable "1-2" with Okonski, scored the amazing "golden" goal which gave AEK the historic title victory.

In the Cup, AEK did not do well, after being eliminated in the second round by Levadiakos, with the yellow-blacks having major complaints from the referee in the second leg, with Gidopoulos as their main expressor.

The star of the team were Mirosław Okoński, Stelios Manolas, Giorgos Savvidis, Toni Savevski (since December) and Spyros Ikonomopoulos who had an incredible performance giving valuable points to the team with 3 crucial penalty kicks saves during the season . The team's top scorer in the league is Miroslaw Okonski with 11 goals.

Players

Squad information

NOTE: The players are the ones that have been announced by the AEK Athens' press release. No edits should be made unless a player arrival or exit is announced. Updated 30 June 1989, 23:59 UTC+3.

Transfers

In

Summer

Winter

Out

Summer

Winter

Loan out

Winter

Renewals

Overall transfer activity

Expenditure
Summer:  ₯270,000,000

Winter:  ₯0

Total:  ₯270,000,000

Income
Summer:  ₯0

Winter:  ₯30,000,000

Total:  ₯0

Net Totals
Summer:  ₯270,000,000

Winter:  ₯30,000,000

Total:  ₯240,000,000

Pre-season and friendlies

Alpha Ethniki

League table

Results summary

Results by Matchday

Fixtures

Greek Cup

Group 13
<onlyinclude>

Matches

Round of 32

UEFA Cup

First round

Statistics

Squad statistics

! colspan="11" style="background:#FFDE00; text-align:center" | Goalkeepers
|-

! colspan="11" style="background:#FFDE00; color:black; text-align:center;"| Defenders
|-

! colspan="11" style="background:#FFDE00; color:black; text-align:center;"| Midfielders
|-

! colspan="11" style="background:#FFDE00; color:black; text-align:center;"| Forwards
|-

! colspan="11" style="background:#FFDE00; color:black; text-align:center;"| Left during Winter Transfer window
|-

|}

Disciplinary record

|-
! colspan="17" style="background:#FFDE00; text-align:center" | Goalkeepers

|-
! colspan="17" style="background:#FFDE00; color:black; text-align:center;"| Defenders

|-
! colspan="17" style="background:#FFDE00; color:black; text-align:center;"| Midfielders

|-
! colspan="17" style="background:#FFDE00; color:black; text-align:center;"| Forwards

|-
! colspan="17" style="background:#FFDE00; color:black; text-align:center;"| Left during Winter Transfer window

|}

Starting 11

References

External links
AEK Athens F.C. Official Website

AEK Athens F.C. seasons
AEK Athens
1988–89